Richard "Dickie" Rock (born 10 October 1936) is an Irish singer. He experienced much success on the Irish charts during the 1960s, but has continued on as a popular live act as well as occasionally hitting the charts ever since.

Early fame
Rock was born in the North Strand, Dublin and raised in Cabra on Dublin's Northside.

Between 1963 and 1972, he was one of the frontmen of the Miami Showband (who were later in the headlines due to the Miami Showband killings incident). He had 13 top ten hits with the Miami Showband, including seven number ones. Dickie Rock and the Miami Showband were the first Irish artists to go straight into the number one spot with "Every Step of the Way" in 1965. During his time with the Miami Showband, Rock attracted the kind of mass hysteria normally reserved for The Beatles.

In 1966, he sang for Ireland in the 1966 Eurovision Song Contest with the song, "Come Back to Stay". He entered as a solo artist and finished fourth in the Contest. This song also became a number one hit in Ireland.

Solo years
Rock went solo in 1973, although still performed occasionally with the Miami Showband after this.

Later years
Rock continued to tour well into his eighties. Following a third RTÉ documentary (one in the 1960s, another in the 1980s and another in 2006) about Rock and his place at the forefront of the Irish showband scene, he received a lifetime achievement award in October 2009. In 2019, he announced his final tour would be held in October that year. In 2021, at the age of 84, Rock retired from showbusiness due to hearing problems.

Personal life
Rock married his wife Judy (née Murray) in 1966. Judy died in April 2022 several weeks after contracting COVID-19.

Discography
Irish chart singles
 1963 "There's Always Me" (IR #1)
 1964 "I'm Yours" (#1)
 1964 "From the Candy Store On the Corner" (#1)
 1965 "Just for Old Time's Sake" (#2)
 1965 "Round and Round" (#2)
 1965 "Every Step of the Way" (#1)
 1965 "I Left My Heart in San Francisco" (#4)
 1965 "Wishing it Was You" (#1)
 1966 "Come Back to Stay" (#1)
 1966 "Darling I Love You" (#4)
 1967 "When You Cry" (#7)
 1967 "Baby I'm Your Man" (#13)
 1968 "Simon Says" (#1)
 1968 "Christmas Time and You" (#10)
 1969 "Emily" (#12)
 1970 "When My Train Comes In" (#15)
 1971 "My Heart Keeps Telling Me" (#7)
 1971 "Cathedral in the Pines" (#15)
 1972 "Till (Mini Monster)" (#9)
 1973 "The Last Waltz" (#15) – first solo single
 1973 "Maxi single" (#11)
 1977 "Back Home Again" (#1)
 1978 "It's Almost Like a Song" (#18)
 1980 "Coward of the County" (#11)
 1982 "When the Swallows Come Back from Capistrano" (#24)
 1988 "The Wedding" (#18)
 1989 "I'll Never Stop Wanting You" (#10)
 1989 "Come Home to Ireland for Christmas" (#25)

References

External links

1936 births
Living people
Irish rock singers
Irish male singers
People from Cabra, Dublin
Eurovision Song Contest entrants for Ireland
Eurovision Song Contest entrants of 1966
Pye Records artists